Blue Waters is a village in Saint John Parish, Antigua and Barbuda.

Demographics 
Blue Waters has one enumeration district, 30600 Blue Waters.

References 

Populated places in Antigua and Barbuda
Saint John Parish, Antigua and Barbuda